Darban may refer to:
 Darban, Bushehr (در بان - Darbān)
 Darban, Kurdistan (دربن - Darban)